The Woodlawn Garden of Memories is a cemetery in Houston, Texas which is included in the National Register of Historic Places. NRHP lists Dionicio Rodriguez as the cemetery's architect.

Notable burials
 Jennifer Ertman and Elizabeth Peña (1977 & 1978 – both died 1993), murder victims
 Chloe Jones (1975–2005), pornographic actress
 Marvin Zindler (1921–2007), TV reporter

Further reading

References

1931 establishments in Texas
Cemeteries in Harris County, Texas
Cemeteries in Houston
Cemeteries on the National Register of Historic Places in Texas
National Register of Historic Places in Houston